Photis conchicola is a species of marine amphipod crustacean which lives in the Eastern Pacific Ocean. It often inhabits discarded gastropod shells, which it attaches to marine plants.

Ecology
Predators of P. conchicola include the fish Embiotoca lateralis. The shells used by P. conchicola are chiefly Alia carinata, Tricolia pulloides, Bittium eschrichtii, Amphissa versicolor, Lacuna marmorata and Lacuna unifasciata.

References

Corophiidea
Crustaceans of the eastern Pacific Ocean
Crustaceans described in 1936